The Omekaido Overbridge (Japanese: 新宿大ガード) is a bridge in Shinjuku, Tokyo, Japan, which carries rail lines over the Ōme Kaidō highway.

External links
 

Bridges in Tokyo
Shinjuku